The Florio family is a prominent entrepreneurial Italian family who started many lucrative activities in Sicily involving above all the exportation of Sicilian products (such as Marsala wine) in the nineteenth century, in some ways redeeming Sicily from feudal immobility. The family extended its interests to shipping, shipbuilding, fisheries, mining, metallurgy and ceramics.

Founder
The founder of the dynasty was Vincenzo Florio Sr. (1799-1868), who gave impulse to the tuna fishing and its canned preparation in Palermo. He also was involved in the sulfur industry and founded a bank. In 1832 he established a factory of Marsala wine and, in 1841, the Oretea foundry. As a ship owner he promoted the development of maritime communications with the continent, building numerous steamers. His son Ignazio Florio Sr. (1838-1891) considerably developed all the other industries founded by his father. In the beginning of the 1900s, the family had to face an increasingly deteriorated economic reality in Sicily and suffered failures and closures of activities.

Florio winery
Founded in Marsala in 1832 by Vincenzo Florio Sr., the Florio winery (Cantine Florio) has been in continuous Marsala wine production since then. Florio became the first Italian producer of Marsala wine. He built splendid cellars in the town's tuff rock in which to produce and conserve the wine. The winery carries the emblem of a lion.

Shipping
In October 1861, soon after Sicily was incorporated into the Kingdom of Italy, Vincenzo Florio Sr. founded the Societa in Accomandita Piroscafi Postali-Ignazio & Vicenzo Florio (Florio Line) with a fleet of nine steamers. In 1881, Ignazio Florio Sr. merged with the Rubattino company in Genoa, giving rise to the Navigazione Generale Italiana, which operated a line on New York City. The company also ran to Mediterranean and Black Sea ports, Canada, India, the Far East and South America. At the time of the merger, the Florio Line was already a major company with a monopoly of the trade in the Mediterranean. The New York Times described the Florios as the "merchant princes of Europe". The Florio Line brought 50 ships into the merger, while Rubattino contributed 40.

The Cantiere navale di Palermo (Palermo Shipyard) in Palermo, Sicily, was founded in 1897 by Ignazio Florio Jr., grandson of Vincenzo Florio. Construction was protracted and Florio was forced to sell his stake in the shipyard to Attilio Odero in 1905.

Newspaper
The newspaper L'Ora was founded on the initiative of the Florio family in Palermo. The first issue was published on April 22, 1900. The formal owner was Carlo Di Rudinì, the son of the former prime minister of Italy Antonio Di Rudinì, but the main shareholder and financier was Ignazio Florio Jr. The political direction of the newspaper was generally republican and progressive, representing the Sicilian entrepreneurial middle class.

Motor racing
In 1906, Vincenzo Florio created the Targa Florio, one of the oldest car races in the world. The first Targa Florio covered 277 miles through multiple hairpin curves on treacherous mountain roads where severe changes in climate frequently occurred and racers even faced bandits and irate shepherds. The race passed through many small villages, and fans lined up along the roads with no protection from the race cars. It was suspended in 1978 because of safety concerns. Today, the race continues with a different circuit as a minor racing event.

References
 

 
Wineries of Italy
Marsala
History of Sicily